Langatabbetje Airstrip , is an airport on Langatabbetje island in the Moroni River, Suriname.

Charters and destinations 
Charter airlines serving this airport are:

See also

 List of airports in Suriname
 Transport in Suriname

References

External links
OpenStreetMap - Langatabbetje

Airports in Suriname
Sipaliwini District